Gisela Dulko and Flavia Pennetta were the defending champions.
They won this year's event again after beating Renata Voráčová and Barbora Záhlavová-Strýcová in the final 7–6(0), 6–0.

Seeds

Draw

Brackets

External links
 Main Draw

Swedish Open - Women's Doubles
Swedish Open
2010 in Swedish women's sport
Swedish